Jan Hajek or Jan Hájek may refer to:

 Jan Hajek (scientist)
 Jan Hájek (tennis)